Themba Muata-Marlow (born 30 April 1994) is an Australian/English footballer of Jamaican ancestry who currently plays as a central defender for APIA Leichhardt Tigers FC.

External links

References

1994 births
Australian soccer players
Australian people of Jamaican descent
Rockdale Ilinden FC players
A-League Men players
Sydney FC players
Newcastle Jets FC players
APIA Leichhardt FC players
Association football defenders
Living people
National Premier Leagues players
People educated at Endeavour Sports High School